Laureano Ladrón de Guevara Romero (1889–1968), better known as Laureano Guevara, was born in Molin on June 18, 1889 and died in Santiago de Chile on November 21, 1968. He was a Chilean painter, printmaker and muralist.

Education
He began his artistic studies at Valparaiso, where he was a disciple of Juan Francisco Gonzalez with whom he learned drawing. Later, he studied Law and Architecture, which he abandoned to join the School of Fine Arts, University of Chile, where he studied with Jose Mercedes Ortega, Fernando Alvarez de Sotomayor, Alberto Valenzuela Llanos, Ricardo Richon-Brunet and Pedro Lira. He was one of the members of Generation 13.

Work
After gaining recognition for his work and with the money he earned from his first exhibition, he traveled to Europe in 1924 to devote himself to studying the techniques of fresco painting and engraving. Inspired by Paul Cézanne, he joined the movement for the renewal of French painting and was a great admirer of cubist artists.

In Denmark he studied the stained glass technique. On returning to the country in 1927, he was professor of engraving at the School of Fine Arts. He traveled to Europe for the second time with a group of 1928 fellows, as part of the so-called Generation 28.

In Spain he became interested in mural painting for which he became known as a prominent cultor and teacher. Upon his return to Chile in 1932 he created the mural painting course at the School of Fine Arts. He taught at this school for over thirty years.

In his works he recreated the coastal and rural landscape, still life, portraits and traditional scenes, through  pen, ink, chalk, charcoal, oil, watercolor, fresco painting, murals and stained glass. He was noted for the strength of his drawing and recreation of intimate and melancholic atmospheres through a color that characterized Generation Thirteen and which was dominated by pastel and earthy tones.

Recognition
Among the numerous awards he received during his life, the prize obtained at the Latin American Exhibition in Seville in 1929, shared with Arthur Gordon is the most noteworthy. The winning works are located, from 2001, at the University of Talca. He received the National Art Award given by the Chilean government in 1967.

Distinctions
1919: 3rd Place Salón Oficial, Santiago, Chile
1920: 3rd Place Decorative Art Section, Salón Oficial, Santiago, Chile.
1923: 2nd Place Decorative Art Section, Salón Oficial, Santiago, Chile.
1927: Honourable Mention, Applied Art, Salón Oficial, Santiago, Chile.
1929: Gold Medal, International Exposition, Sevilla, España.
1931: Honorable Mention, Salón Oficial, Santiago, Chile.
1937: Ex-aequo Illustrious Award, Santiago Municipality, Santiago, Chile; Certamen Edwards Award, Salón Oficial, Santiago, Chile.
1941: 1st Mural Painting, IV Centenary Committee, Chile; 2nd Prize, Applied Art Category, Chile.
1949: Honour Award, XVI Salón de Verano, Viña del Mar, Chile.
1956: Critics Award, Santiago, Chile.
1957: Honour Award, Salón Oficial, Santiago, Chile.
1967: National Art Award, Santiago, Chile.

Individual exhibitions
1923: Rivas and Calvo Hall, Santiago, Chile.
1948: Bank of Chile Hall, Santiago, Chile.
1980: Bocetos de Laureano Guevara (Sketches of Laureano Guevara), North American-Chilean Institute, Santiago, Chile.
1989: Perspectiva en el Tiempo, (Perspective in Time) Posada del Corregidor Gallery, Santiago, Chile.
1995: Laureano Guevara, Hall of Fine Arts Museum of Archaeology, La Serena, Chile.
1996: Retrospectiva (Retrospective), Viña del Mar Room, Viña del Mar, Chile.
1996: Pedro Olmos Munoz Cultural Extension Center, Talca, Chile.
1998: Cultural Centre of Isla Negra, Chile.
2008: Retrospectiva, (Retrospective) National Museum of Fine Arts, Santiago, Chile.

Works
El Bote Blanco (The White Boat), Oil on Canvas, 33 x 46 cm.
Retrato de Henriette Petit (Portrait of Henriette Petit), Oil on Canvas, 173 x 137 cm.
Figuras (Figures), graphite drawing.
Naturaleza Muerta (Still Life) Oil on cardboard, 50 x 61 cm.
Paisaje de la Costa (Coastal Landscape), Oil on pastel, 44 x 53 cm.
Mural, Museo Nacional de Caracas (National Museum of Caracas Mural), Venezuela.
Tejido de Arauco (Arauco fabric), Oil on Canvas, 198 x 550 cm.
La Agricultura (Agriculture), Oil on Canvas, 200 x 800 cm.
La Minería, (Mining), Oil on Canvas, 199 x 800 cm.
La Pesca (Fishing), Oil on Canvas, 204.5 x 543 cm.
Paisaje desde el Cerro El Roble (View from the Cerro El Roble), Oil on Canvas, 65 x 64 cm.
Trabajo y Familia del Obrero (Worker's Work and Family), 1932, vitral, 525 x 240 cm.
Fresia lanzando a su hijo a los pies de Caupolicán (Fresia throwing his son to's feet from Caupolicán), 1946, restored in 1993.
Mural en la Ciudad del Niño de Santiago (Mural in the City of the Child of Santiago).

1889 births
1968 deaths
Muralists
20th-century Chilean painters
Chilean male artists
Chilean male painters
Male painters
20th-century Chilean male artists